Clatsop Community College (CCC) is a public community college with facilities in Astoria and Seaside, Oregon. The college's service area includes Clatsop County, portions of Columbia and Tillamook counties and Pacific and Wahkiakum counties in Washington state.

History
CCC was established under the direction of the Astoria Board of Education in 1958 and constitutes Oregon's first community college. The original curriculum included  two years of classes that could be transferred and two year sequences in Electronics, Business, Automotive and Building Construction. In 1962, Clatsop County residents  voted to form a county-wide education district and separate the college from the school district. Renovation of the former Astoria High School began in June 1962 and  this facility became the home of CCC.

In October 2008, the college broke ground on the Jerome Campus Redevelopment project. This project, now complete, resulted in the renovation of Towler Hall (the former Astoria High School), renovation of Patriot Hall and the construction of Columbia Hall.  .

Accreditation
Clatsop Community College is accredited by the Northwest Commission on Colleges and Universities (NWCCU).

Facilities
CCC's main campus in Astoria is located on a hillside overlooking the Columbia River. The campus includes the Art Center Gallery that hosts approximately six exhibits annually. In addition, the college operates a Performing Arts Center and conducts maritime, fire and technical programs at its Marine and Environmental Research and Training Station (MERTS campus) located east of Astoria at Tongue Point on the Columbia River. As part of its maritime science program, CCC maintains and operates the training vessel Forerunner. Small business and economic development services, along with other classes, are conducted at the South County Campus in Seaside.

See also 
 List of Oregon community colleges

References

External links
Official website

Community colleges in Oregon
Buildings and structures in Astoria, Oregon
Educational institutions established in 1958
Universities and colleges accredited by the Northwest Commission on Colleges and Universities
1958 establishments in Oregon
Buildings and structures in Clatsop County, Oregon
Education in Clatsop County, Oregon